Charles Terence Priestley Vernam (born 8 October 1996) is an English professional footballer who plays as a winger for EFL League One side Lincoln City.

A product of the Scunthorpe United and Derby County youth academies, he turned professional with the latter and spent time on loan with ÍBV, Coventry City and Grimsby Town. He returned to Grimsby on a permanent basis in 2018 and also saw a brief spell on loan to Chorley whilst with the Mariners. In 2020 he signed for Burton Albion before joining Bradford City only six-month later.

Early life
Vernam was born in Lincoln.

Playing career

Derby County
Vernam was attached to Scunthorpe United as a youth player. In 2012 he was given a six-day trial by Italian giants A.C. Milan, however this did not result in a contract offer and Vernam returned to Scunthorpe before joining the Derby County academy later that year. In August 2013, he appeared for the first team against Burton Albion in the pre-season Bass Charity Vase. He signed his first professional contract with Derby in 2015. He was loaned out to ÍBV in Iceland's Úrvalsdeild between April and July 2016, scoring on his senior debut when appearing as a substitute in a 4–0 win against ÍA. He made a total of eleven appearances for ÍBV, without scoring again.

Vernam was promoted to Derby's first team squad for the 2016–17 season while also continuing to play for their under-23 team, for whom he made three appearances in the EFL Trophy. During December 2016, he signed a new contract with the club, running until 2019. He made his competitive first team debut for Derby as a substitute in an FA Cup win against West Bromwich Albion in January 2017. Later that month, he was loaned to Coventry City in League One for the rest of the season. Vernam was cup-tied for Coventry's win in the 2017 EFL Trophy Final.

Grimsby Town
Vernam went on loan again in January 2018, joining Grimsby Town in League Two for the rest of the season. The move reunited him with manager Russell Slade, who had also signed him for Coventry.

After impressing the new manager Michael Jolley in the closing season, Vernam joined Grimsby Town permanently on a two-year contract on 24 July 2018. He scored the first goal on 37-minutes in the FA Cup second round, a left-footed shot following a corner, in a 2–0 victory at National League club Chesterfield. After struggling to get into the Grimsby starting lineup, he joined National League club Chorley on a one-month loan in November 2019.

Vernam's goal against Colchester United on 11 February 2020 was voted as the EFL League Two goal of the season. He had picked the ball up from the edge of his own area before going on to beat three defenders before hit a strike low beyond the keeper from the edge of the area.

Burton Albion
On 20 July 2020, Vernam joined League One club Burton Albion on a two-year contract. On 31 January 2021 he was erroneously linked with Bolton Wanderers as mentioned on the Bolton News website.

Bradford City
On 1 February 2021, Vernam joined Bradford City on an 18-month deal. He was one of seven players offered a new contract by Bradford City at the end of the 2021–22 season.

Lincoln City
On 17 June 2022, Vernam agreed to join hometown club Lincoln City having rejected the contract offer to stay at Bradford. He would make his debut on 13 August, coming off the bench against Forest Green Rovers. His first Imps goal came in the EFL Trophy against Doncaster Rovers on 20 September 2022.

Playing style
Vernam plays as a winger.

Career statistics

References

External links
Charles Vernam profile at the Grimsby Town F.C. website

1996 births
Living people
English footballers
Association football wingers
Derby County F.C. players
Íþróttabandalag Vestmannaeyja players
Coventry City F.C. players
Grimsby Town F.C. players
Chorley F.C. players
Burton Albion F.C. players
Bradford City A.F.C. players
Lincoln City F.C. players
English Football League players
Úrvalsdeild karla (football) players
National League (English football) players
English expatriate footballers
English expatriate sportspeople in Iceland
Expatriate footballers in Iceland